Skokovo is a rural locality (a village) in Nikolotorzhskoye Rural Settlement, Kirillovsky District, Vologda Oblast, Russia. The population was 32 as of 2002.

Geography 
Skokovo is located 29 km east of Kirillov (the district's administrative centre) by road. Nikolsky Torzhok is the nearest rural locality.

References 

Rural localities in Kirillovsky District